On 7 August 1942, US and Australian naval forces undertook the invasion of the Japanese-held islands of Guadalcanal and Tulagi in the lower Solomon Islands chain, the first Allied offensive in the Pacific Theatre. The landing of the US 1st Marine Division on the beaches of Savo Sound began the unexpectedly long and extremely arduous Guadalcanal Campaign, lasting officially until 9 February 1943.

The naval forces dedicated to Operation Watchtower were minuscule compared to those deployed for later Allied offensives such as the invasion of the Gilberts and the capture of Okinawa. This is owing to the commitment the United States had made to Great Britain to undertake the invasion of North Africa in the fall of 1942, a commitment which essentially left the Guadalcanal operation with the naval leftovers. For this reason, American sailors and Marines referred to the invasion as "Operation Shoestring".

 US Navy combat ships:
3 fleet carriers, 1 fast battleship, 9 heavy cruisers, 2 anti-aircraft light cruisers, 31 destroyers

 Amphibious assault vessels:
13 transports, 6 attack cargo ships, 4 destroyer transports

 Auxiliaries:
5 fast minesweepers, 5 oilers

 Australian Navy combat ships:
2 heavy cruisers, 1 light cruiser

Command structure

Theater command 
The roles of Commander in Chief, Pacific Ocean Areas (CINCPOA) and Commander in Chief, U.S. Pacific Fleet (CINCPAC), were both exercised by Admiral Chester W. Nimitz from his headquarters at Pearl Harbor, Hawaii.

Since the Solomons lie in the Southern Pacific, the landings of 7 August 1942 on Guadalcanal were the responsibility of the South Pacific Fleet, led by Vice Admiral Robert L. Ghormley from his headquarters at Noumea, New Caledonia. Adm. Ghormley's pessimism, inadequate staff work and unwillingness to visit the front led Adm. Nimitz to replace him with the much more aggressive and hands-on Vice Admiral William F. Halsey on 18 October 1942.

Operational command 
Operational command of the invasion was assigned to Vice Admiral Frank Jack Fletcher, who also had direct command of the covering force, designated Task Force 61, where he flew his flag aboard fleet carrier Saratoga. This embodiment of two levels of command in a single officer enabled a decision-making process that left the Marine forces on Guadalcanal essentially stranded and short-supplied. The amphibious forces, Task Force 62, were led by Rear Admiral Richmond Kelly Turner aboard transport McCawley.

Bitter disputes between the two men arose during both the planning and execution of the invasion over how long Fletcher's aircraft carriers would stay in the vicinity of Guadalcanal to provide air cover for the Marines ashore. Fletcher decided the matter after multiple assaults on the Allied amphibious task force by bombers from the Japanese base at Rabaul on D-Day and D+1. These attacks convinced Fletcher that his crucial aircraft carriers could not be risked in the waters of the Solomons any longer and he ordered his carriers along with Turner's still-half-full cargo ships out of the area on the night of 8 August. This decision resulted in much hard feeling among the Marines ashore, who felt that the Navy had abandoned them.

Forces afloat

Expeditionary Force (Task Force 61) 
Vice Admiral Frank Jack Fletcher

Air Support Force (Task Group 61.1)

Rear Admiral Leigh Noyes
 Task Unit under Vice Admiral Fletcher
 Vice Admiral Fletcher
 1 fleet carrier
  (Capt. DeWitt C. Ramsey)
 Air Group (Cmdr. Harry D. Felt)
 VF-5: 34 F4F Wildcat fighters (Lt. Cmdr. Leroy C. Sampler)
 VB-3: 18 SBD Dauntless dive bombers (Lt. Cmdr. Dewitt W. Shumway)
 VS-3: 18 SBD Dauntless scout bombers (Lt. Cmdr. Louis J. Kirn)
 VT-8: 16 TBF Avenger torpedo bombers (Lt. Harold H. Larsen)
 2 New Orleans-class heavy cruisers
  (Capt. Frank J. Lowry)
  (Capt. Walter S. DeLany)
 Screen (Capt. Samuel B. Brewer)
 1 Porter-class destroyer (8 × 5-in. main battery): 

 Task Unit from old Task Force 16
 Rear Admiral Thomas C. Kinkaid
 1 fleet carrier
  (Capt. Arthur C. Davis)
 Air Group (Lt. Cmdr. Maxwell F. Leslie)
 VF-6: 36 F4F Wildcat fighters (Lt. Louis H. Bauer)
 VB-6: 18 SBD Dauntless dive bombers (Lt. Ray Davis)
 VS-5: 18 SBD Dauntless scout bombers (Lt. Turner F. Caldwell, Jr.)
 VT-3: 14 TBF Avenger torpedo bombers (Lt. Cmdr. Charles M. Jett)
 1 North Carolina-class fast battleship
  (Capt. George H. Fort)
 1 Portland-class heavy cruiser
   (Capt. Laurance T. DuBose)
 1 Atlanta-class anti-aircraft light cruiser
  (Capt. Samuel P. Jenkins)
 Screen (Capt. Edward P. Sauer)
 2 Gleaves-class destroyers (5 × 5-in. main battery): , 
 1 Gridley-class destroyer (4 × 5-in. main battery): 
 1 Benham-class destroyer (4 × 5-in. main battery): 
 1 Porter-class destroyer (8 × 5-in. main battery): 

 Task Unit under Rear Admiral Noyes

 Rear Admiral Noyes
 1 fleet carrier
  (Capt. Forrest P. Sherman)
 Air Group (Lt. Cmdr. Wallace M. Beakley)
 VF-71: 29 F4F Wildcat fighters (Lt. Cmdr. Courtney Shands)
 VS-71: 15 SBD Dauntless scout bombers (Lt. Cmdr. John Eldridge, Jr.)
 VS-72: 15 SBD Dauntless scout bombers (Lt. Cmdr. Ernest M. Snowden)
   VT-7:   9 TBF Avenger torpedo bombers (Lt. Henry A. Romberg)
 1 New Orleans-class heavy cruiser
  (Capt. Charles H. McMorris)
 1 Pensacola-class heavy cruiser
  (Capt. Ernest G. Small)
 Screen (Capt. Robert G. Tobin)
 2 Benson-class destroyers (4 × 5-in. main battery): , 
 1 Gleaves-class destroyer (4 × 5-in. main battery): 

 Fueling group
 5 oilers

South Pacific Amphibious Force (Task Force 62) 
Rear Admiral Richmond Kelly Turner in transport McCawley

 Convoy (Task Group 62.1)
 Captain Lawrence F. Reifsnider in transport 
 Embarking  1st Marine Division (Maj. Gen. Alexander A. Vandegrift, USMC, Commander ground forces)

 Transport Group "X-Ray" – Guadalcanal Landings
 Captain Reifsnider
 Transport Division A (Capt. Paul S. Theiss)
 Embarking 5th Marines less 2nd Battalion (Col. LeRoy P. Hunt, USMC)
 2 transports: , 
 1 attack cargo ship: 
 Transport Division B (Capt. Charlie P. McFeaters)
 Embarking Division HQ and 1st Marines (Col. Clifton B. Cates, USMC)
 1 attack cargo ship: 
 Transport Division C (Capt. Reifsnider)
 Embarking part of Support Group, Special Weapons Battalion, 5th Battalion / 11th Marines, part of 3rd Defense Battalion
 1 transport: 
 Transport Division D (Capt. Ingolf N. Kiland)
 Embarking 2nd Marines less 1st Battalion (Col. John M. Arthur, USMC)
 1 attack cargo ship: 

 Transport Group "Yoke" – Tulagi Landings
 Captain George B. Ashe
 Transport Division E (Capt. Ashe)
 Embarking 2nd Battalion / 5th Marines, 1st Battalion / 2nd Marines, 1st Parachute Battalion, Co. E / 1st Raider Battalion (Brig. Gen. William H. Rupertus, USMC)
 Transport Division 12 (Capt. Hugh W. Hadley)
 Embarking 1st Raider Battalion less Co. E (Lt. Col. Merritt A. Edson, USMC)

 Escort (Task Group 62.2)

 Rear Admiral Victor A.C. Crutchley, RN
 3 heavy cruisers
   (Capt. H.B. Farncomb, RAN)
   (Capt. F.E. Getting, RAN)
  (Capt. Howard D. Bode)
 1 light cruiser
   (Capt. H.A. Showers, RAN)
 Screen (Capt. Cornelius W. Flynn)
 1 Porter-class (8 × 5-in. main battery): 

 Fire Support Group L (Task Group 62.3)
 Captain Frederick L. Riefkohl 3 heavy cruisers
 2 New Orleans-class:  (Capt. Riefkohl),  (Capt. Samuel N. Moore)
 1 Astoria-class:  (Capt. William G. Greenman)
 4 destroyers
 2 Benham-class (4 × 5 in. main battery): ,  2 Farragut-class (4 × 5 in. main battery): ,  (Lt. Cmdr. Charles F. Chillingworth, Jr.)

 Fire Support Group M (Task Group 62.4)
 Rear Admiral Norman Scott 1 anti-aircraft light cruiser (Atlanta class)
  (Capt. James E. Maher)
 2 destroyers (both Gleaves-class (5 × 5-in. main battery, then 4 × 5-in.)
 ,  Minesweeper Group (Task Group 62.5)
 5 fast minesweepers (ex-Clemson-class destroyers)

Notes

References

Bibliography 

Conflicts in 1942
Pacific Ocean theatre of World War II
Naval aviation operations and battles
Guadalcanal Campaign
Naval battles of World War II involving Australia
Naval battles of World War II involving the United States
August 1942 events
World War II orders of battle
United States Navy in World War II